Cheoyongmu is a representative Korean mask dance based on the legend of Cheoyong (처용, 處容), a son of the Dragon King of the Eastern Sea. It is also the oldest surviving Korean court dance created during the Unified Silla period. Cheoyongmu has also been considered as a shamanistic dance because it was performed to drive off evil spirits at the end of the year.

The dancer’s movements are usually majesty and vigour. It also depends on the style & tempo of music, which punctuated by various lyrical song recitations.  The dance is always performed by five dancers, and its costumes and masks are noteworthy. 

It is inscribed in UNESCO Intangible Cultural Heritage List from 2009 and enlisted as South Korean Intangible Cultural Property from 1971.

See also
Korean dance
Korean mask
Korean mythology
Samguk Yusa
Akhak Gwebeom
Korean shamanism
Important Intangible Cultural Properties of Korea

References

External links

 General description, images and video clip of the Cheoyongmu at Ministry of Culture and Tourism (South Korea)

Korean dance
Important Intangible Cultural Properties of South Korea

Intangible Cultural Heritage of Humanity
Korean culture